The Gregory S. Coleman Unit, formerly known as the Lockhart Unit, is a state prison for women located in Lockhart, Caldwell County, Texas, operated (as of September 2015) by Management and Training Corporation under contract with the Texas Department of Criminal Justice.

Lockhart was previously operated by the GEO Group.  This facility was opened in January 1993, and has a maximum capacity of 1000 female inmates held at lower security levels.

In 2021, the unit was renamed the Gregory S. Coleman Unit to honor a former member of the Texas Board of Criminal Justice.

References

Prisons in Texas
Buildings and structures in Caldwell County, Texas
Management and Training Corporation
1993 establishments in Texas